The Sheffield Amalgamated Union of File Trades was a trade union in the United Kingdom. It was formed in 1915 by the merger of the Machine File Forgers' Union and the Machine File Cutters' Union.  In 1917, it merged with the hand-file forgers and file hardeners unions.  From 1918, it admitted all workers in the file trade who were not eligible to join other unions.  It merged with the Transport and General Workers' Union in 1970.

References

See also
 Transport and General Workers' Union
 TGWU amalgamations

1915 establishments in England
Defunct trade unions of the United Kingdom
History of Sheffield
Engineering trade unions
Industrial unions
Transport and General Workers' Union amalgamations
Trade unions established in 1915
Trade unions disestablished in 1970
Trade unions based in South Yorkshire